Gwyn R Price is a Welsh Labour politician who served as the Member of the Welsh Assembly (AM) for Islwyn from 2011 to 2016.

On 18 February 2014, Price announced his intention to stand down at the elections in 2016. He subsequently faced widespread criticism on social media over his perceived lack of engagement in the Assembly.

References

Living people
Welsh Labour members of the Senedd
Wales AMs 2011–2016
Year of birth missing (living people)